The golden bat (Mimon bennettii) is a bat species found in Brazil, Colombia, French Guiana, Guyana, Suriname and Venezuela.

References

Phyllostomidae
Bats of South America
Bats of Brazil
Mammals of Colombia
Mammals described in 1838
Taxa named by John Edward Gray